Šakić is a Serbo-Croatian surname, derived from the word šaka, meaning "fist". Notable people with the name include:

 Dinko Šakić, Croatian fascist, commander of Jasenovac concentration camp
 Marko Šakić, Serbian ice hockey player
 Miladin Šakić, former president of FK Red Star
 Nikola Šakić, Serbian footballer

Sakic, the spelling without diacritics, may refer to:

 Brian Sakic, Canadian ice hockey player
 Joe Sakic, Canadian ice hockey player

See also
Sakić

Serbian surnames
Croatian surnames